Topel Lee is a Filipino film director, TV director and music video director known for the cinematography in his movies and his strong female characters.

Filmography as director

Television 
 2019 Bukas May Kahapon
 2018 Spirits: Reawaken
 2017-2018 Hanggang Saan
 2015-2016 Parang Normal Activity
 2014 Elemento
 2014 Confessions of a Torpe
 2013 Kidlat
 2013 Dormitoryo
 2013 Undercover
 2012 Third Eye
 2011-2012 Regal Shocker
 2011 Ang Utol Kong Hoodlum
 2011 Carlo J. Caparas' Bangis
 2011 Mistaken Identity
 2009 Kung Aagawin Mo Ang Lahat Sa Akin
 2009 Dear Friend
 2009 Ang Babaeng Hinugot sa Aking Tadyang
 2008 Obra
 2008 Gagambino
 2007 My Only Love
 2007 Kamandag
 2007 La Vendetta

Film 
 2018 The Hopeful Romantic
2017 Bloody Crayons
 2014 Basement
 2012 Amorosa (director)
 2011 Tumbok
 2010 Shake, Rattle & Roll 12 (segment: "Isla")
 2010 White House
 2009 Wapakman
 2009 Sundo
 2008 Shake, Rattle & Roll X (segment: "Class Picture")
 2007 Shake, Rattle & Roll 9 (segment: "Engkanto")
 2007 My Kuya's Wedding
 2007 Ouija
 2006 Shake, Rattle & Roll 8 (segment: "Yaya")
 2006 Imahe Nasyon (segment: "Ang Manunulat")

References

External links
 

Living people
Year of birth missing (living people)
Filipino screenwriters
Filipino television directors
GMA Network (company) people
Filipino film directors